Pang Jiaying (born January 6, 1985, in Shanghai) is a female Chinese freestyle swimmer who competed in the 2004 Summer Olympics, the 2008 Summer Olympics and the 2012 Summer Olympics. Pang is one of the best Chinese women in middle and long-distance freestyle swimming.

She won the silver medal as part of the Chinese 4 × 200 m freestyle relay team in Athens. In the 200 metre freestyle competition she finished seventh and in the 400 metre freestyle event she finished 14th.

In 2008, she won the bronze medal in women's 200m freestyle at the Beijing Olympics. She placed first in the semifinal of the women's 100m freestyle, but was disqualified after a false start. Subsequently, the world-record holder and world champion Libby Trickett was promoted from ninth to eighth and last qualifier into the final, as a result of having the 9th fastest time in the semifinals.

Major performances
2003: Barcelona World Swimming Championships: Third, women's 4 × 200 m freestyle relay
2004: Shanxi National Swimming Championship: First, women's 100m freestyle, 200m freestyle and 400m freestyle
2004: Athens Olympics: Seventh, women's 200m freestyle; second, women's 4 × 200 m freestyle relay
2004: World Short Course Swimming Championships: Seventh, women's 200m freestyle
2005: National Games: Second, women's 200m freestyle
2008: Beijing Olympics: Third, women's 200 m freestyle

See also
China at the 2012 Summer Olympics - Swimming

References

External links
 
 
 
 

1985 births
Living people
Olympic bronze medalists for China
Olympic silver medalists for China
Olympic swimmers of China
Swimmers from Shanghai
Swimmers at the 2004 Summer Olympics
Swimmers at the 2008 Summer Olympics
Swimmers at the 2012 Summer Olympics
World record holders in swimming
Olympic bronze medalists in swimming
Chinese female freestyle swimmers
World Aquatics Championships medalists in swimming
Medalists at the FINA World Swimming Championships (25 m)
Asian Games medalists in swimming
Swimmers at the 2006 Asian Games
Medalists at the 2008 Summer Olympics
Medalists at the 2004 Summer Olympics
Asian Games gold medalists for China
Asian Games silver medalists for China
Olympic silver medalists in swimming
Medalists at the 2006 Asian Games
Universiade medalists in swimming
Universiade gold medalists for China
Medalists at the 2003 Summer Universiade
Medalists at the 2007 Summer Universiade
21st-century Chinese women